Stewart Clay Myers is the Robert C. Merton Professor of Financial Economics at the MIT Sloan School of Management.
He is notable for his work on capital structure and innovations in capital budgeting and valuation, and has had a "remarkable influence" on both the theory and practice of corporate finance. Myers, in fact, coined the term "real option". He is the co-author with Richard A. Brealey and Franklin Allen of Principles of Corporate Finance, a widely used and cited business school textbook, now in its 11th edition. He is also the author of dozens of research articles.

Career 
He holds a Ph.D. and MBA from Stanford University and an A.B. from Williams College. He began teaching at MIT Sloan School of Management in 1966.

His contributions are seen as falling into three main categories:
Work on capital structure, focusing on "debt overhang" and "pecking order theory".
Contributions to capital budgeting that complement his research on capital structure. He is notable for the adjusted present value (or APV) approach as well as for recognizing the "option-like" character of many corporate assets.
Work on estimating fair rates of return for public utilities.
Recent projects include the valuation of investments in R&D, risk management, and the allocation of capital in diversified firms, and the theory of corporate governance.

He is currently a principal of economic consulting firm The Brattle Group. He is a past president of the American Finance Association, a research associate of the National Bureau of Economic Research, and a director of the Cambridge Endowment for Research in Finance.

Works 
Stewart C. Myers (ed) Modern Developments in Financial Management, Dryden Press, 1976, 
Alexander A. Robichek, Stewart C. Myers, Optimal financing decisions, Prentice-Hall, 1965

Richard A. Brealey, Stewart C. Myers, Capital Investment and Valuation, McGraw Hill Professional, 2003,

References

External links
 Stewart Myers - MIT Sloan Biography
 Business Week Profile
 Publication list
 The Contributions of Stewart Myers to the Theory and Practice of Corporate Finance, Journal of Applied Corporate Finance

Living people
Financial economists
American finance and investment writers
American textbook writers
American male non-fiction writers
Williams College alumni
Corporate finance theorists
Real options
MIT Sloan School of Management faculty
Presidents of the American Finance Association
Year of birth missing (living people)